Prozor may refer to:

 Prozor, Bosnia and Herzegovina, a town in the Prozor-Rama municipality in Bosnia and Herzegovina
 Prozor, Croatia, a village near Otočac, Croatia
 Prozor Fortress, a fortress in Dalmatia, Croatia